Back to Back: Raw & Uncut is a 2008 live album by the hip-hop artists Method Man and Street Life.

Album tracks
Reunited - GZA (01:05)
Publicity - GZA (00:53)
4th Chamber - GZA (01:16)
Shadowboxin' - GZA (01:22)
Clan in Da Front - GZA (01:24)
Bring Da Ruckus - GZA (01:32)
Milk the Cow - Cappadonna (01:16)
Duel of the Iron Mic - GZA (04:56)
Cold World - GZA (01:52)
Liquid Swords - GZA (03:10)
Living in the World Today - GZA  (03:16)
Beneath the Surface - GZA  (01:52)
Guillotine (Swordz) - GZA  (01:00)
Older Gods Freestyle - Cappadonna & Freemurda (02:30)
Killah Hills 10304 - GZA   (02:07)
Acapella - Cappadonna (01:59)
Intro - Method Man & Street Life (02:12)
Prequal - Method Man & Street Life (01:29)
Supreme Interlude - Method Man & Street Life (01:11)
Method Man - Method Man & Street Life (02:47)
Gridiron Rap - Method Man & Street Life (01:05)
Bring the Pain - Method Man & Street Life (01:26)
Ice Cream - Method Man & Street Life (01:14)
All I Need - Method Man & Street Life (02:08)
Run 4 Cover - Method Man & Street Life (01:32)
Do You Really (Thang Thang) - Method Man & Street Life (01:12)
How High - Method Man & Street Life (02:46)
What the Blood Clot - Method Man & Street Life (02:28)
Suspect Chin - Method Man & Street Life (03:10)
The Motto - Method Man & Street Life (04:11)
4:20 - Method Man & Street Life (04:01)
Fallout - Method Man & Street Life (03:55)
Odb Tribute - Brooklyn Zu (02:13)
Interlude - Method Man & Street Life (02:04)
Judgement Day - Method Man & Street Life (01:19)
Stage Dive Outro - Method Man & Street Life  (00:00)
Bonus Material [DVD]

References

Streetlife (rapper) albums
Method Man albums
2008 compilation albums